Lecithin retinol acyltransferase is an enzyme that in humans is encoded by the LRAT gene.

Function 

Lecithin retinol acyltransferase is a microsomal enzyme that catalyzes the esterification of all-trans-retinol into all-trans-retinyl ester during phototransduction, an essential reaction for the retinoid cycle in visual system and vitamin A status in liver.

Clinical significance 

Mutations in this gene have been associated with early-onset severe retinal dystrophy.

LRAT was overexpressed in colorectal cancer cells compared to normal colonic epithelium. Strong LRAT expression was associated with a poor prognosis in patients with colorectal cancer.

See also
 The Visual Cycle

References

Further reading

External links
  GeneReviews/NCBI/NIH/UW entry on Retinitis Pigmentosa Overview